The 1895 Drake Bulldogs football team was an American football team represented Drake University as an independent during the 1895 college football season. In its first and only season under head coach Hermon Williams, the team compiled a 1–4 record and was outscored by a total of 48 to 22.

Schedule

References

Drake
Drake Bulldogs football seasons
Drake Bulldogs football